Hoseynabad-e Hormeh (also Romanized as Ḩoseynābād-e Ḩormeh; also known as Ḩoseynābād) is a village in Golashkerd Rural District, in the Central District of Faryab County, Kerman Province, Iran. At the 2006 census, its population was 45, in 11 families.

References 

Populated places in Faryab County